St Tiernach's Park is the principal GAA stadium of Ulster GAA located in County Monaghan, Ireland. It is used mainly for Gaelic football.

Such is its association with the town of Clones, which is located to the south, the venue itself is often referred to simply as Clones. With a current capacity of 36,000, it hosts major Gaelic football matches such as the Ulster Senior Football Championship final and is home to Clones GAA and Monaghan GAA.

History
The ground is named after Saint Tiarnach (Tigearnach, d. AD 548), who founded Clones as a monastic settlement  AD 500. The Ulster Final was held in Clones from 1905 until 2004. Prior to this, a mixture of grounds were used as venues for the Ulster final. Between 2004 and 2006, due to increased capacity, the Ulster Final was played at Croke Park in Dublin. However, with the 2007 Leinster Senior Football Championship final being scheduled for the same date, that year's Ulster Final was restored to Clones, with Tyrone narrowly defeating Monaghan by a scoreline of 1–15 to 1–13. The Ulster Final has been held in Clones every year since 2007. The capacity of St Tiernach’s Park capacity was originally 36,500 spectators, but that was reduced in 2019 following a health and safety review. 2019 marked the 75th anniversary of St Tiernach's Park.

Structure
The covered stand on one side of St Tiernach's Park is called the Gerry Arthurs Stand. It is named after Gerry Arthurs (1906-1991), who was treasurer of the Ulster Council for 42 years (1934 - 1976). In 2009, Arthurs was named in the Sunday Tribune'''s list of the 125 Most Influential People In GAA History''. On the other side of the ground is the Pat McGrane Stand (seated), with The Hill (standing) behind it. The terrace behind the goals on the town side is called O'Duffy Tce, with the seating on the opposite side called the Eastern Stand.

Facilities

See also
 List of Gaelic Athletic Association stadiums
 List of stadiums in Ireland

References

Clones, County Monaghan
Gaelic games grounds in the Republic of Ireland
Monaghan GAA
Sports venues in County Monaghan